= Pekkanini =

Swedish composer/musician (born 1952)

Pekka Lunde (2 July 1952 – 30 June 2021), known as Pekkanini, was a Swedish composer andmusician who specialized in playing the theremin.

Lunde was born in Uppsala. He created the rock group Ensamma Hjärtan together with fellow musician Gunnar Danielsson in the 1970s. Later they formed the duo Danielsson & Pekkanini and had some radio hits in the 1980s. Pekkanini made his first solo albums in 1982 and 1986, Pekkanini and Spotlight. Since the early 1980s he has composed music for more than 100 Swedish plays all around the country. As a theremin player he has made three solo albums, Theremin Magic (2010), Theremins in the Jukebox (2011) and Theremin Tunes Played in Odd Bars (2013). He also produced an album with songs by Sardinian composer Enrico Pasini called Songs for which he arranged and interpreted Pasini's music for the theremin.

In 2010 he won in a category of The People's Music Awards. Pekkanini is a member of the National Academy of Recording Arts and Sciences.

Lunde died in Gothenburg.
